The Fabius Village Historic District in Fabius, New York is a  historic district that was listed on the National Register of Historic Places in 2000. It includes 57 contributing buildings, 2 contributing sites, 2 contributing structures, and 4 contributing objects.

The Historic District is located in Onondaga County, New York.

Contributing properties include:
First Baptist Church, the most prominent building in the district
Cemetery of first Baptist church
Fabius United Methodist Church, 7818 Academy Street, with a denticulated cornice
Fabius Central School, c. 1930, a collegiate Gothic style school 
7767 Academy Street, c. 1860, a Gothic Revival style house
7771 Academy Street, c. 1870, a Gothic Revival style house
7824 Main Street, c. 1840
Stevens-Wheaton-Hamilton House, 7833 Main Street 
7763 Main Street, 1830, a Federal style house
7764 Main Street, c. 1885, a Queen Anne style house with a 2-story carriage barn
Fabius Evergreen Cemetery, c. 1860, a rural cemetery

References

Houses on the National Register of Historic Places in New York (state)
Federal architecture in New York (state)
Historic districts in Onondaga County, New York
Historic districts on the National Register of Historic Places in New York (state)
National Register of Historic Places in Onondaga County, New York